Neral may refer to:
 An isomer of Citral
 Neral, India, a town in Raigad district in the Indian state of Maharashtra
 Neral railway station
 A Romulan from Star Trek